Gülməmmədli or Gyul’mamedli or Gul’mamedly or Gyulmamedly may refer to:
Gülməmmədli, Goranboy, Azerbaijan
Gülməmmədli, Jalilabad, Azerbaijan